AntiVirus Gold is a rogue software developed by ICommerce Solutions S.A. that poses as a legitimate antivirus program. It attempts to persuade users to buy the software by displaying ads and other nagware. It is believed that the name of the program is an attempt at social engineering to confuse people about the legitimate program AVG Anti-Virus. 

AntiVirus Gold may be downloaded in a bundle with other software or by some Trojan horse software. Antivirus Gold has also been rebranded under many names such as Antivirus Golden and Antispyware Gold.

Symptoms of infection 
In a typical infection, the desktop wallpaper is modified and an advertisement is displayed urging the user to buy Antivirus Gold. Upon clicking on the message, a web browser is opened to point to www.AntiVirus-Gold.com. Users have also reported that they are being directed to the site after clicking on the infected desktop. The program attempts to reinstall itself after a reboot if removed by uninstalling or system restore.

Removal 
AntiVirus Gold is detected by common anti-virus programs, including CA Antispyware, the Norton family of security products, and AVG Anti-Virus. Anti-malware programs, such as Malwarebytes' AntiMalware, are also very effective in detecting and removing rogue software such as AntiVirus Gold.

See also 
 SpySheriff
 Rogue security software

References 

Rogue software